Santtu-Matias Rouvali (born 5 November 1985) is a Finnish conductor and percussionist.  He is currently chief conductor of the Tampere Philharmonic Orchestra and of the Gothenburg Symphony Orchestra, and principal conductor of the Philharmonia Orchestra.

Biography
Rouvali was born in Lahti into a family of musicians. Rouvali's parents played in the Lahti Symphony Orchestra.  He is the oldest of the three sons in his family.  One of his younger brothers died in a car accident at age 23.

Rouvali learned percussion as a youngster, and continued his studies at the Sibelius Academy.  Rouvali competed in the Eurovision Young Soloists Finnish qualifier in 2004 as a percussionist.  As a percussionist, he performed with such orchestras as the Mikkeli City Orchestra, the Lahti Symphony Orchestra, and the Finnish Radio Symphony Orchestra.  At age 22, he focused more on studies in conducting at the Sibelius Academy, where his teachers included Jorma Panula, Leif Segerstam and Hannu Lintu.

In September 2009, Rouvali guest-conducted the Finnish Radio Symphony Orchestra as an emergency substitute conductor.  He first guest-conducted the Tapiola Sinfonietta in November 2010.  Later in the same month, the Tapiola Sinfonietta named Rouvali an artist-in-association with the orchestra, effective September 2011, with an agreement of 3 years.

Rouvali first guest-conducted the Tampere Philharmonic Orchestra in January 2010.  He subsequently returned as a guest conductor in December 2011.  In September 2012, the orchestra announced the appointment of Rouvali as its chief conductor, effective with the 2013–2014 season, with an initial contract of 3 years.  His Tampere contract was later extended to 2020.  In April 2022, the orchestra announced that Rouvali is to conclude his chief conductorship in Tampere at the close of the 2022-2023 season.

Outside of Finland, Rouvali first guest-conducted the Copenhagen Philharmonic in November 2011.  He subsequently became principal guest conductor of the Copenhagen Philharmonic with the 2013–2014 season.  In August 2014, Rouvali made his first guest-conducting appearance with the Gothenburg Symphony Orchestra (GSO).  In May 2016, the GSO announced the  appointment of Rouvali as its next chief conductor, effective with the 2017–2018 season, with an initial contract of 4 years.  In May 2019, the GSO announced the extension of Rouvali's contract through 2025.

Rouvali first guest-conducted the Philharmonia Orchestra in January 2013.  In March 2017, the Philharmonia announced the appointment of Rouvali as one of its two new principal guest conductors, effective with the 2017–2018 season.  In May 2019, the Philharmonia announced the appointment of Rouvali as its next principal conductor, effective with the 2021–2022 season, with an initial contract of 5 years. In September 2020, the Philharmonia released its first recording with Rouvali as conductor, a recording of Swan Lake made in 2019.

Rouvali has made commercial recordings with the Oulu Philharmonic Orchestra for Ondine, and with the Tampere Philharmonic for Orfeo.  He has conducted music of Sibelius with the Gothenburg Symphony for Alpha Classics.

Rouvali and his family live in Lepsämä in the municipality of Nurmijärvi.

References

External links
 Tampere Philharmonic Finnish-language page on Santtu-Matias Rouvali
 Harrison Parrott agency page on Santtu-Matias Rouvali
 Gothenburg Symphony Orchestra page on Santtu-Matias Rouvali

 

1985 births
Living people
Finnish conductors (music)
Sibelius Academy alumni
21st-century conductors (music)